Big Walnut High School is a public high school located in Sunbury, Ohio.  It is the only high school in the Big Walnut School District. The first Big Walnut High School to open was in August of 1951 at 105 Baughman Street. The current building was opened in January of 2022 to meet the demands of the growing district and has a student population of 1221. The school's mascot is the Golden Eagle.

History 
Big Walnut Local School District was formed by a legislative action of the Delaware County Board of Education in January 1950. The previous rivals of Galena and Sunbury School districts were abolished and the new district was formed.  It was named for the Big Walnut Creek which flows through both towns.

Prior to consolidation, the Sunbury District had purchased 56 acres of land south of Sunbury and north of Galena in preparation for building a new high school.  Galena had likewise passed a levy to build but had not purchased the land.  The merged district needed the new school so it was decided to build on the land formerly owned by Sunbury School.  Since then, the land has been annexed into the village for water and sewer.

October 27th,1950, A.D. St. Clair of the State Department of Education broke ground for the high school at 105 Baughman Street on 56 acres of land purchased prior to consolidation, Big Walnut High School opened in 1951. It housed 8th through high school students for a year.

The first one story building in the Big Walnut Local School District was very modern with the best gym in the county. The school had science labs, shop labs, as well as vocational agriculture and home economic rooms.

On September 17, 1991, the new Big Walnut High School opened at 555 South Old 3-C Highway on part of the original 50 acres Sunbury School had owned.  Located south of the former Big Walnut High School which now became a Junior High School, this building sat where a former ecology center had been. One addition was added in 2006, but ultimately the tenants outgrew the facility, moving into the current building in January of 2022.

Athletics
The Big Walnut Golden Eagles compete in the Ohio Capital Conference. The official school colors are scarlet and Goldenrod, however, Red and Gold are typically used and accepted. As of the 2022-2023 school year, the following Ohio High School Athletic Association (OHSAA) sanctioned sports were offered;

Baseball

Basketball (Boys/Girls)

Bowling (Boys/Girls)

Cross Country (Boys/Girls)

Football (Boys)

Golf (Boys/Girls)

Gymnastics (Girls)

Lacrosse (Boys/Girls)

Soccer (Boys/Girls)

Softball

Swimming & Diving (Boys/Girls)

Tennis (Boys/Girls)

Volleyball (Boys/Girls)

Wrestling (Boys/Girls)

State Champions 
Cheerleading - 2013, 2021

Varsity Football - 2007

Boys' Golf - 2002

Notable alumni
 Greg Lehman - co-founder of Watershed Distillery
 Adam Shaheen - National Football League (NFL) tight end
 Dave Yost - Ohio Attorney General

References

External links
 
 District website

High schools in Delaware County, Ohio
Educational institutions established in 1991
Public high schools in Ohio
1991 establishments in Ohio